Final X: Rutgers was an amateur wrestling event produced by USA Wrestling and FloSports held on June 7-8, 2019 at the Rutgers Athletic Center in Piscataway, New Jersey.

History 
This event was originally headlined by the returning World Champion David Taylor and US Open champion Pat Downey. However, on late May, it was announced that Taylor had to withdraw from the series due to an injury suffered at Beat The Streets. This resulted on Downey earning the spot for the World Championships.

After the original headline had fallen apart, it was replaced by the co-main event, a series between another returning World Champion in J'den Cox and another US Open champion Bo Nickal.

The second (and ultimately last) match between Yianni Diakomihalis and Zain Retherford was very controversial due to its ruling and final result, as it was first thought that Diakomihalis had won the match 8 points to 6, leading to a third match. However, the match was ultimately ruled a 6-6 criteria decision win for Retherford. Due to the controversy, a wrestle-off took place in a special event.

Results

See also
Final X

References 

Amateur wrestling
Wrestling
Annual sporting events in the United States
Freestyle wrestling
Recurring sporting events established in 2018
Sports in New Jersey
Greco-Roman wrestling